IASP  may refer to:

 International Association for the Study of Pain
 International Association for Suicide Prevention
 International Association of Science Parks and Areas of Innovation, see Science park